William Joseph Whalen (January 1, 1926 – March 25, 2008) was a nationally known US non-fiction writer and an expert on comparative religion.

Biography

Whalen attended the University of Notre Dame and received degrees from Marquette and Northwestern. He was an information officer with the U. S. Navy during World War II and served on Saipan and Guam.

For over forty years Whalen worked at Purdue University as a professor of communication. From 1950 he also directed the publications program at that school and in 1960 helped found Purdue University Press.

Whalen, a Roman Catholic, authored or co-authored fifteen books and wrote over two hundred articles, pamphlets and encyclopedia articles.  Much of his writing compares Catholicism with other beliefs.

He died in 2008 at the age of 82 in West Lafayette, Indiana.  At his death, he was director emeritus of university publications and professor emeritus of communication.

Partial list of writings 
 Books

Separated Brethren: A Review of Protestant, Anglican, Eastern Orthodox & Other Religions..., Our Sunday Visitor (IN); Revised ed. (September 2002), 287pp., 
Christianity and American Freemasonry, Ignatius Press (1998, 3rd ed.) 215pp., 
Your Guide to Effective Publications: a handbook for campus publications professionals, with Kelvin J. Arden, CASE (1991), 167pp.  
Strange Gods: Contemporary Religious Cults in America, Our Sunday Visitor Inc., Ex-library ed. (December 1981), 130pp. 
Other Religions in a World of Change, with Carl J. Pfeifer S.J., Ave Maria Press (1975), 128pp. 
Minority Religions in America,  Alba House; Rev Sub ed. (1972), 226pp.  
 
Handbook of Secret Organizations, Bruce Publishing: Milwaukee (1966), 169pp.  LCCN 66-026658
Armageddon Around the Corner: a report on Jehovah's Witnesses, J. Day Co.: New York (1962), 249pp.  OCLC Number: 1261733
Christian Family Finance, Paulist Press (Revised ed. 1964), 160pp.  (1960 ed., Bruce Publishing, ASIN: B0007DZQ6S)
Faiths for the Few: A Study of Minority Religions (Bruce Publishing, 1963)

 Pamphlets

Reaching Out to the Lutherans with Heart and Mind, Liguori Publications (June 1984), 32pp.  
Reaching Out to the Methodists with Heart and Mind, Liguori Publications (June 1984), 32pp.  
Reaching Out to the Presbyterians and the Reformed with Heart and Mind, Liguori Publications (June 1984), 32pp.  
Reaching Out to the Baptists with Heart and Mind, Liguori Publications (June 1984), 32pp.  
Reaching Out to the Episcopalians with Heart and Mind, Liguori Publications (June 1984), 32pp.

References

External links 
Photo of William J. Whalen in 1951 as University Editor at Purdue e-Archives

1926 births
2008 deaths
American religious writers
American Roman Catholics
Marquette University alumni
Northwestern University alumni
University of Notre Dame alumni